Westbound Train is a ska band from Boston, Massachusetts, formed in 2001. Their name originates from the Dennis Brown hit song by the same name.

Westbound Train released their first album, Searching for A Melody, in 2002. The band self-released their second album, Five to Two, in 2005, which featured guest appearances from Alex Desert of Hepcat and King Django. The album was re-released by Stomp Records on March 14, 2006.

Westbound Train were featured on the Hellcat Records compilation Give 'Em the Boot IV in November 2004. In January 2006, Hellcat announced that they had signed the band. A third full-length, titled Transitions, was released in September 2006.

Westbound Train played the Summer of Ska tour in the summer of 2006, along with Suburban Legends, Big D and the Kids Table, Voodoo Glow Skulls, and Catch 22. Westbound Train also played the Fall of Ska tour in the fall of 2006, along with Reel Big Fish, Streetlight Manifesto, and Suburban Legends.

Band members
Obi Fernandez - Lead Vocals, Trombone
Rich Graiko - Trumpet
Luke Penella - Tenor Saxophone, flute
Gideon Blumenthal - Piano, Organ, Backing Vocals
Alex Brumel - Lead Guitar, Backing Vocals
Alex Stern - Rhythm Guitar, Backing Vocals
Thaddeus Merritt - Bass guitar
Eric Novod - drums

Discography

Albums
Searching for a Melody (2003)
Five to Two (2005)
Transitions (2006)
Come and Get It  (2009)
Dedication (2022)

Compilation appearances
Give 'Em the Boot IV (2004)
Give 'Em the Boot V (2006)
Give 'Em the Boot VI (2007)
Ska Is Dead (2007)

References

External links
 Band MySpace
 Westbound Train on Hellcat Records

Hellcat Records artists
Musical groups from Boston
Third-wave ska groups
American ska musical groups